Benni Smales-Braithwaite (born 29 April 2002) is an English professional footballer who plays as a striker for Guiseley, on loan from Barrow.

Career
Smales-Braithwaite played youth football for Manchester City and Southampton, turning professional in June 2019, before spending time on loan at non-league club Gloucester City,

He signed for Barrow in August 2022. Later that month he moved on loan to Warrington Rylands 1906.

On 18 November 2022, Smales-Braithwaite joined National League North side Curzon Ashton on a one-month loan deal. In January 2023, he extended his contract with Barrow until the end of the season and extended his loan with Curzon Ashton. He moved on loan to Guiseley in February 2023.

Career statistics

References

2002 births
Living people
English footballers
Manchester City F.C. players
Southampton F.C. players
Gloucester City A.F.C. players
Barrow A.F.C. players
Warrington Rylands 1906 F.C. players
Curzon Ashton F.C. players
Guiseley A.F.C. players
National League (English football) players
English Football League players
Association football forwards
Northern Premier League players